The New Testament uses a number of athletic metaphors in discussing Christianity, especially in the Pauline epistles and the Epistle to the Hebrews.  Such metaphors also appear in the writings of contemporary philosophers, such as Epictetus and Philo, drawing on the tradition of the Olympic Games, and this may have influenced New Testament use of the imagery.

The metaphor of running a race "with perseverance" appears in Hebrews 12:1, and related metaphors appear in Philippians 2:16, Galatians 2:2, and Galatians 5:7. In 2 Timothy 4:7, Paul writes "I have fought the good fight, I have finished the race, I have kept the faith."

In 1 Corinthians 9:24–26, written to the city that hosted the Isthmian Games, the metaphor is extended from running to other games, such as boxing, to make the point that winning a prize requires discipline, self-control, and coordinated activity.  In 2 Timothy 2:5 the same point is made. These athletic metaphors are also echoed in later Christian writing.

As with New Testament military metaphors, these metaphors appear in many hymns, such as Fight the Good Fight with All Thy Might, which was sung in the film Chariots of Fire; and "Angel Band", which was sung in the film O Brother, Where Art Thou?.

New Testament athletic metaphors were embraced by advocates of muscular Christianity, both in the Victorian era and in later times.

See also
 New Testament military metaphors

References

Athletic
Metaphors referring to sport
Christianity and sports